Aubers is a commune in the Nord department in northern France. The parish church is dedicated to St Vaast.

It was the site of a major World War I battle, the Battle of Aubers, during 1915.

Aubers is twinned with the English town of Wadhurst.

Population

Heraldry

See also
Communes of the Nord department

References

Communes of Nord (French department)
French Flanders